"Those Sexy Saucer Gals (WeHaveLove Remix)" is the fourth single by The Superions, a side project of Fred Schneider of The B-52s.  From April–June 2010, The Superions held a remix contest for their song "Those Sexy Saucer Gals", the Swedish band WeHaveLove was chosen as the winner and "Those Sexy Saucer Gals (WeHaveLove Remix)" was released as a digital single on iTunes on August 24, 2010. The song was later included on the digital "Bonus Track Version" of The Superions EP released on March 1, 2011.

Track listing
 "Those Sexy Saucer Gals (WeHaveLove Remix)" 3:56

Personnel 

Production
 Additional Remix and Production by WeHaveLove
 Artwork: Dan Marshall

Music video
A music video by Tom Yaz starring the burlesque group The Atomic Bombshells was released on YouTube on August 27, 2010.

External links
 Those Sexy Saucer Gals (WeHaveLove Remix) - Single on iTunes

References

The Superions songs
Songs written by Fred Schneider
2010 songs